Winford Hood is a former professional American football player who played offensive lineman for five seasons for the Denver Broncos.

References

1962 births
American football offensive guards
American football centers
Denver Broncos players
Georgia Bulldogs football players
Players of American football from Georgia (U.S. state)
Living people